Lerchenberg may refer to:

Places

Germany
 , a hill near Döhlen Basin in Saxony, Germany
 Lerchenberg (Dachwig), a hill of Thuringia
 , a hill in the Hildesheim Forest near Neuhof, Hildesheim, Niedersachsen
 Lerchenberg (Plauen), a hill of Saxony
 Lerchenberg (Schwarzwald), a mountain near Wildberg, Calw, Baden-Württemberg
 , a hill in the Seulingswald in Thuringia
 Mainz-Lerchenberg, a quarter of Mainz, Rhineland-Palatinate
 A hamlet in the municipality of Konradsreuth, Hof, Bavaria
 A village of Wildberg, Baden-Württemberg

Other places
 Stare Serby, a village in Głogów, Lower Silesia, Poland
 A village of Erlenbach, Switzerland

Other uses
 , a German sitcom with Stephan Kampwirth
  (born 1953), German actor in TV series including Löwengrube – Die Grandauers und ihre Zeit

See also
 Lerchenborg
 Lärchenberg